Jim Camm (born 27 May 1932) is a former  Australian rules footballer who played with St Kilda in the Victorian Football League (VFL).

Notes

External links 

Living people
1932 births
Australian rules footballers from Victoria (Australia)
St Kilda Football Club players